Alberto Rio (21 August 1894 – ?) was a Portuguese footballer who played as forward.

Football career 

Rio gained 2 caps for Portugal and made his debut 17 December 1922 in Lisbon against Spain, in a 1-2 defeat.

External links 
 
 

1894 births
Portuguese footballers
Association football forwards
C.F. Os Belenenses players
Portugal international footballers
Year of death missing
Place of birth missing